In philosophy, theophysics is an approach to cosmology that attempts to reconcile physical cosmology and religious cosmology. It is related to physicotheology, the difference between them being that the aim of physicotheology is to derive theology from physics, whereas that of theophysics is to unify physics and theology.

Usage
 (2002) uses the term in a critique of physicotheology, i.e. the view that arguments for the existence of God can be derived from the existence of the physical world (e.g. the "argument from design").  Theophysics would be the opposite approach, i.e. an approach to the material world informed by the knowledge that it is created by God.

Richard H. Popkin (1990) applies the term to the "spiritual physics" of Cambridge Platonist Henry More and his pupil and collaborator Lady Anne Conway, who enthusiastically accepted the new science, but rejected the various forms of materialist mechanism proposed by Descartes, Hobbes and Spinoza to buttress it, as these, More and Conway argued, were incapable of explaining productive causality. Instead, More and Conway offered what Popkin calls "a genuine important alternative to modern mechanistic thought", "a thoroughly scientific view with a metaphysics of spirits to make everything operate". Materialist mechanism triumphed, however, and today their spiritual cosmology, as Popkin notes, "looks very odd indeed".

The term has been applied by some philosophers to the system of Emanuel Swedenborg. William Denovan (1889) wrote in Mind: "The highest stage of his revelation might be denominated Theophysics, or the science of Divine purpose in creation." R. M. Wenley (1910) referred to Swedenborg as "the Swedish theophysicist".

Pierre Laberge (1972) observes that Kant's famous critique of physicotheology in the Critique of Pure Reason (1781; second edition 1787) has tended to obscure the fact that in his early work, General History of Nature and Theory of the Heavens (1755), Kant defended a physicotheology that at the time was startlingly original, but that succeeded only to the extent that it concealed what Laberge terms a theophysics ("ce que nous appellerons une théophysique").

Theophysics is a fundamental concept in the thought of Raimon Panikkar, who wrote in Ontonomía de la ciencia (1961) that he was looking for "a theological vision of Science that is not a Metaphysics, but a Theophysics.... It is not a matter of a Physics 'of God', but rather of the 'God of the Physical'; of God the creator of the world... not the world as autonomous being, independent and disconnected from God, but rather ontonomicly linked to Him". As a vision of "Science as theology", it became central to Panikkar's "cosmotheandric" view of reality.

Frank J. Tipler's Omega Point theory (1994), which identifies concepts from physical cosmology with theistic concepts, is sometimes referred to by the term, although not by Tipler himself. Tipler was an atheist when he wrote The Anthropic Cosmological Principle (1986, co-authored with John D. Barrow, whose many popular books seldom mention theology) and The Physics of Immortality (1994), but a Christian when he wrote The Physics of Christianity (2007). In 1989, Wolfhart Pannenberg, a liberal theologian in the continental Protestant tradition, welcomed Tipler's work on cosmology as raising "the prospect of a rapprochement between physics and theology in the area of eschatology". In subsequent essays, while not concurring with all the details of Tipler's discussion, Pannenberg has defended the theology of the Omega Point.

The term is also occasionally used as a nonce word in parodies or humorous contexts, as by Aldous Huxley in Antic Hay (1923).

See also
 Anthropic principle
 Fine-tuned universe
 List of science and religion scholars
 Multiverse
 Natural theology
 Omega Point
 Tipler's Omega Point
 Ultimate fate of the universe
 Zygon: Journal of Religion and Science

References

Further reading
 John D. Barrow and Frank J. Tipler, Foreword by John A. Wheeler, 1986. The Anthropic Cosmological Principle. Oxford University Press. . Excerpt from Chapter 1.
 William Lane Craig and Quentin Smith, 1993. Theism, Atheism, and Big Bang Cosmology. Oxford Univ. Press.
 William Dembski, 1998. The Design Inference. Cambridge Univ. Press.
David Deutsch, 1997. The Fabric of Reality New York: Alan Lane. . Extracts from Chapter 14: "The Ends of the Universe," with additional comments by Frank J. Tipler; also available here and here.
Arthur Eddington, 1930. Why I Believe in God: Science and Religion, as a Scientist Sees It.
George Ellis and Nancey Murphy, 1996. On the Moral Nature of the Universe: Theology, Cosmology, and Ethics. Augsburg Fortress Publishers. 
Henry Margenau, 1992. Cosmos, Bios, Theos Scientists Reflect on Science, God, and the Origins of the Universe, Life, and Homo sapiens. Open Court.
E. A. Milne, 1952. Modern Cosmology and the Christian Idea of God. Oxford Univ. Press.
Arthur Peacocke, 1979. Creation and the World of Science.
John Polkinghorne, 1994. The Faith of a Physicist. Princeton Univ. Press.
---------, 1998. Science and Theology. .
---------, 2000. Faith, Science and Understanding. Yale University Press. ; .
[Lawrence Poole], 2003, "SELF-Empowerment", IQ Press.
Saunders, Nicholas, 2002. Divine Action and Modern Science. Cambridge Univ. Press.
Russell Stannard, 1999. The God Experiment. Faber. The 1987–88 Gifford lectures.
Richard Swinburne, 2004 (1979). The Existence of God.
Frank J. Tipler, 1994. The Physics of Immortality: Modern Cosmology, God and the Resurrection of the Dead. Doubleday. .
 --------, 2007. The Physics of Christianity. Doubleday. . Chapter I and excerpt from Chapter II. Chapter I also available here.
Charles Hard Townes, 1966, "The Convergence of Science and Religion," Think.
 Simon Sam Gutierrez, 1991, The Solomon Formula insaecula saeculorum: A Theophysical Find, TXu000559229

External links
 Theophysics. A website mainly about Tipler's Omega Point Theory, with links to short nontechnical articles mostly by Tipler, but also some by Deutsch and Pannenberg.
 entertheophysics, A website containing the 12 principles of Theophysics as explained by the author, training consultant and conference speaker Lawrence Poole.  Poole also relates several applications of Theophysics including a "unified field formula".

Religion and science
Religious cosmologies